Esoteric Recordings is a UK independent record label specialising in 1970s progressive rock, folk, psychedelic, and jazz-rock reissues as part of Cherry Red Records. Its releases include both catalogue reissues and new works from artists who share a similar musical heritage.

The label's founder is Mark Powell, who has been a freelance music consultant for Universal, Sony and EMI since 2000; he has also worked with Soft Machine, Caravan, Camel, Man, and Hawkwind, as well as producing label retrospectives covering Deram, Decca, Vertigo, Harvest and United Artists. His consultancy work led to the formation of an independent reissue label, titled Eclectic Discs, to license overlooked releases he considered worthwhile but weren't of sufficient commercial stature to interest major labels. Other releases are sourced from the artists themselves, while the label has also been involved in the release of DVD material from artists including Barclay James Harvest.

Speaking in 2008, Powell said: 

Among the label's releases have been box sets including the six-CD Jack Bruce Can You Follow? and the four-CD Bill Nelson Trial by Intimacy (The Book of Splendours)  as well as standalone releases by artists including: Man, Claire Hamill, The Keef Hartley Band, Egg, Michael Moorcock, Gary Farr, Daevid Allen, and Rare Bird.

In 2012, Esoteric Recordings started a front line record label, Esoteric Antenna, which put out the debut album by Squackett (Steve Hackett and Chris Squire) called A Life Within a Day. It has also signed the Oxford-based band Sanguine Hum and guitarist Matt Stevens.

Signed artists

Daevid Allen
Anderson Bruford Wakeman Howe
Tony Banks
Barclay James Harvest
Blossom Toes
Arthur Brown
Jack Bruce
Camel
Curved Air
Disco Jets
Egg
East of Eden
Gary Farr
Bill Fay
FM
Keef Hartley Band
Claire Hamill
Hawkwind
Love Sculpture
Man
Mellow Candle
Michael Moorcock
Morgan
Morgan Fisher and Lol Coxhill
Bill Nelson
Rare Bird
Todd Rundgren
Space Ritual
Squackett
Supersister
Tangerine Dream
Wigwam
Chris Wood

References
1. Interview with Alex Ogg for 'My Favourite Flavour' magazine issue 006 2008

British independent record labels
Record labels established in 2007
Reissue record labels
IFPI members
Progressive rock record labels
Cherry Red Records